Minerva Airlines was an airline based in Italy, which was operational from 1996 to 2003.

The airline suspended operations due to bankruptcy on 25 October 2003. It had operated eight Dornier 328-110 aircraft partly under a codeshare agreement with Alitalia. In March 2004 there were reports that Minerva Airlines might resume operations using ATR 42 aircraft operating regional services on behalf of Alitalia. A further report in March also suggested that Alitalia might take over Minerva Airlines and transfer the turboprop fleet of Alitalia Express to them. In June 2004 there was a report that they planning to resume wet-lease operations on behalf of Alitalia using up to seven ATR 42-300s in the summer.

Fleet

Accidents and Incidents
Alitalia Flight 1553, a Dornier 328 operated by Minerva on behalf of Alitalia which overran the runway at Genoa Airport on 25 February 1999.

References

Italian companies disestablished in 2003
Defunct airlines of Italy
Airlines established in 1996
Airlines disestablished in 2003
Italian companies established in 1996